Zhao Lan (born July 1, 1963) is a Chinese chess Woman International Master. She was Women's National Chess Champion in 1982.

Zhao competed for the China national chess team at the 26th Chess Olympiad in 1984 with an overall record of 5 games played (+2, =2, -1).

China Chess League
Zhao Lan played for Qingdao and Zhejiang chess clubs in the China Chess League (CCL).

See also
Chess in China

References

External links

Zhao Lan New in Chess - NICBase Online Info

1963 births
Living people
Chinese female chess players
Chess Woman International Masters